Teen Paheliyan is a 2018 Indian thriller/sci-fi anthology created by National award-winning filmmaker Sujoy Ghosh that aired on Star Plus on 22 April 2018. The anthology comprises three short stories titled Mirchi Malini, Copy, and Good Luck, starring Vikrant Massey, Surveen Chawla, Kunaal Roy Kapur, Tina Desai, Paoli Dam, Akshay Oberoi, Shraddha Das, and Rukhsar Rehman.

Plot 
Teen Paheliyan is a collection of three independently shot films having elements of suspense, excitement, anticipation, and thrill.

Good Luck 
Written and directed by Sujoy Ghosh, Good Luck revolves around Jenny Saxena (played by Tina) who runs a cafe. She bumps into Peter Palekar (Kunal), a salesperson who sells Good Luck.

Copy 
Helmed by Arindam Sil, Copy narrates the story of a young boy named Sid who hires a robot which is a replica of himself. But things soon begin to go wrong when the robot starts controlling his life. The story is about a conflicted mind that is striving to find a ground on who he wants to be and what the society wants him to be.

Mirchi Malini 
Malini played by Paoli Dam, is a Gastrologer. She can tell a person's deepest darkest secret by tasting a spoon of their handmade dish.

List of short films

Cast
Mirchi Malini
 Paoli Dam as Mirchi Malini
 Shraddha Das as Damini
 Tara Alisha Berry	as Kusum
 Neha Chauhan as Monika
 Akshay Oberoi as Arjun
 Rukhsar Rehman as Rita Malik

Copy
 Vikrant Massey as Siddharth
 Surveen Chawla as Mamta
 Anupriya Goenka as Simona

Good Luck
 Tina Desai as Jenny Saxena	
 Kunaal Roy Kapur as Peter Palekar
 Darshan Jariwala as Ritchie Selva	
 Amrita Bagchi as Ava

References

External links 
 Teen Paheliyan on Hotstar

Indian anthology films
Indian short films
StarPlus original programming